Salva (Latin for "Save") may refer to:

People
Francisco Salva Campillo (1751-1828), Spanish scientist
Ramon d'Salva (born 1921), Filipino actor
Héctor Salva (1939-2015), Uruguayan football midfielder
Salva Kiir Mayardit (born 1951), South Sudanese president
Salva Iriarte (born 1952), Spanish football midfielder and football manager
Antonio Salvá (born 1952), Spanish politician and urologist
Victor Salva (born 1958), American film director
Salva (footballer, born 1961), Spanish football defender
Salva Díez (born 1963), Spanish basketball player
Federica Salva (born 1971), Italian yacht racer
Salva Sanchis (born 1974), Spanish dancer
Salva Ballesta (born 1975), Spanish football striker
Salva (footballer, born 1981), Spanish football defender and football manager
Salva (music producer) (born 1981), American musician
Salva Sevilla (born 1984), Spanish football midfielder
Salva Arco (born 1984), Spanish basketball player
Bartolomé Salvá-Vidal (born 1986), Spanish tennis player
Julio Salvá (born 1987), Argentine football goalkeeper
Salva Chamorro (born 1990), Spanish football forward
Nico Salva (born 1990), Filipino basketball player
Salva Ferrer (born 1998), Spanish football defender

Locations
Salva, Bistrița-Năsăud, a commune in Romania
Şəlvə, Khojali, Azerbaijan
Şəlvə, Lachin, Azerbaijan

Other
Common sage
Salva (cheese), from Italy
Salva (India), a tribe in ancient India
Salva veritate, Latin phrase
Salva congruitate, Latin term for logic

See also
Salva Nos (disambiguation)
Salvador (disambiguation)
Salvas (disambiguation)
Salvatore (disambiguation)
Salvo (disambiguation)
Salwa (disambiguation)
Şəlvə (disambiguation)